The  foundation is a public interest corporation (公益法人) established on February 26, 1926 for the management and preservation of the cultural heritage of the Maeda clan, rulers of the Kaga Domain. It is located in Komaba, Meguro, Tokyo. The collection is centered on written materials including ancient documents or Japanese and Chinese books but also contains crafts items such as swords, armour or household items. This collection of old books, ancient records and documents is open to researchers on request only.

22 National Treasures and 76 Important Cultural Properties of Japan are in possession of Maeda Ikutokukai.  As the library does not have the display facilities of a museum, viewing requests are generally denied. However, the Ishikawa Prefectural Museum of Art in Kanazawa contains an exhibition room devoted to the Maeda Ikutokukai collection in which arts and crafts items are permanently on display.

See also
List of National Treasures of Japan (ancient documents)
List of National Treasures of Japan (writings: Chinese books)
List of National Treasures of Japan (writings: Japanese books)
List of National Treasures of Japan (writings: others)
List of National Treasures of Japan (crafts: swords)

References

Cultural organizations based in Japan
Museums in Japan
Maeda clan
Organizations established in 1926
1926 establishments in Japan